Dr. Mohammed Saleh Ahmed Al-Helali is a Yemenite Diplomat.
From 27 September 2007 to 21 August 2017 he was Yemenite Ambassador to Russia.

References 

Yemeni diplomats
Year of birth missing (living people)
Living people
Ambassadors of Yemen to Russia
Ambassadors of Yemen to Ukraine